Thomas Hall (15 December 1876 – 1955) was an English footballer who played in the Football League for Glossop and Stockport County.

References

1876 births
1955 deaths
English footballers
Association football midfielders
English Football League players
Macclesfield Town F.C. players
Stockport County F.C. players
Glossop North End A.F.C. players